Miroslav Lipovský (born November 19, 1976) is a Slovak professional ice hockey goaltender who played with Frederikshavn White Hawks in the AL-Bank Ligaen during the 2011–12 season.

References

External links

Living people
HK Poprad players
HC Košice players
Slovak ice hockey goaltenders
Year of birth missing (living people)
Sportspeople from Skalica
Slovak expatriate ice hockey players in Russia
Slovak expatriate sportspeople in Russia
Expatriate ice hockey players in Denmark

1976 births